Arie Hershkovich is an Israeli lecturer of Urban Management and Political Science. He has a PhD in urban planning from the Technion. He has been the chief planner of the Jewish Agency, where he was involved mainly with programs of regional development and social integration.
His areas of interest are multi-ethnic cities, education in a multi-ethnic society, local e-government, and e-learning in a multi-ethnic society.
He has published several papers, book chapters and a book about spatial planning.

References

Living people
Year of birth missing (living people)
Place of birth missing (living people)
Technion – Israel Institute of Technology alumni
People of the Jewish Agency for Israel
Israeli urban planners